A school counselor is a professional who works in elementary, middle, and high school to provide academic, career, college access/affordability/admission, guidance, and social-emotional competencies to all students through a school counselling program.

Academic, career, college, and social-emotional interventions and services
The four main school counseling program interventions include school counseling curriculum classroom lessons and annual academic, career/college access/affordability/admission, and social-emotional planning for every student; and group and individual counseling for some students. School counseling is an integral part of the education system in countries representing over half of the world's population and in other countries it is emerging as a critical support for elementary, middle, and high school learning, post-secondary options, and social-emotional/mental health.

In the Americas, Africa, Asia, Europe, and the Pacific, some countries with no formal school counseling programs use teachers or psychologists to do school counseling emphasizing career development.

Countries vary in how a school counseling program and services are provided based on economics (funding for schools and school counseling programs), social capital (private versus public schools), and school counselor certification and credentialing movements in education departments, professional associations, and local, state/province, and national legislation. School counseling is established in 62 countries and emerging in another seven.

An international scoping project on school-based counseling showed school counseling is mandatory in 39 countries, 32 USA states, one Australian state, three German states, two countries in the United Kingdom, and three provinces in Canada. The largest accreditation body for Counselor Education/School Counseling programs is the Council for the Accreditation of Counseling and Related Educational Programs (CACREP). International Counselor Education programs are accredited through a CACREP affiliate, the International Registry of Counselor Education Programs (IRCEP).

In some countries, school counseling is provided by school counseling specialists (for example, Botswana, China, Finland, Israel, Malta, Nigeria, Romania, Taiwan, Turkey, United States). In other cases, school counseling is provided by classroom teachers who either have such duties added to their typical teaching load or teach only a limited load that also includes school counseling activities (India, Japan, Mexico, South Korea, Zambia). The IAEVG focuses on career development with some international school counseling articles and conference presentations. Both the IAEVG and the Vanguard of Counsellors promote school counseling internationally.

History, school counselor-to-student ratios, and mandates

Armenia
After the collapse of the Soviet Union, the post-Soviet Psychologists of Armenia and the government developed the School Counselor position in Armenian Schools.

Australia
While national policy supports school counseling, only one Australian state requires it. The school counselor-to-student ratio ranges from 1:850 in the Australian Capital Territory to 1:18,000 in Tasmania. School counselors play an integral part in the Australian schooling system; they provide support to teachers, parents, and students. Their roles include counseling students and assisting parents/guardians to make informed decisions about their child's education for learning and behavioral issues.  School counselors assist schools and parents/guardians in assessing disabilities and they collaborate with outside agencies to provide the best support for schools, teachers, students, and parents.

Austria
Austria mandates school counseling at the high school level.

Bahamas
The Bahamas mandate school counseling.

Belgium
Although not mandated, some school counseling occurs in schools and community centers in three regions of the country.

Bhutan
Bhutan mandates a school counseling program for all schools. All schools have full-time school guidance counselors.

Botswana
Botswana mandates school counseling.

Brazil
School counselors in Brazil have large caseloads.

Canada
The roots of school counseling stemmed from a response to the conditions created by the industrial revolution in the early 1900s. Originally, school counseling was often referred to as vocational guidance, where the goal of the profession was to help individuals find their path in a time where individuals previous ways of making a living had been displaced. As people moved towards industrialized cities, counseling was required to help students navigate these new vocations. With a great discrepancy between the rich and the poor, vocational counseling was initiated to help support disadvantaged students. After World War II, vocational guidance began to shift towards a new movement of counseling, which provided a theoretical backing. As the role of school counselors progressed into the 1960s, 1970s and 1980s there has become more uncertainty as to what the role entails. This role confusion continues into the 21st century, where there is a lack of clear consensus between counselors, other teachers, administration, students and parents on what school counselors should be prioritizing.

Throughout Canada, the emerging trend among school counseling programs is to provide a comprehensive and cohesive approach. These programs address the personal, social, educational and career development of students. A comprehensive program consists of four components, including developmental school counseling classroom lessons, individual student planning, responsive services, and school and community support.

 Developmental School Counseling lessons involve small group and class presentations about valuable life skills, which is generally supported through classroom curriculum. 
 Individual student planning involves assessing students abilities, providing advice on goals and planning transitions to work and school. 
 Responsive services includes counseling with students, consulting with parents and teachers, and referrals to outside agencies.
 Support from the school and community includes such things as professional development, community outreach and program management.

The process to become a school counselor varies drastically across each province, with some requiring a graduate level degree in counseling while others require a teaching certification or both. Some provinces also require registration with the relevant provincial College of Registered Psychotherapists. These differences highlight the vast range of expertise required within the role of a school counselor. Regardless of the professional requirements, all school counselors are expected to advise students within the realm of mental health support, course choices, special education and career planning. The Canadian Counselling and Psychotherapy Association, Canada's leading association for counseling and psychotherapy, is working towards alignment among the provinces through partnership and collaboration between provinces. Recent conferences share information on the differences and similarities within each province and how progress is being made to ensure proper regulations are in place at a national level.

In the province of Ontario, Canada, school counselors are found in both elementary and secondary settings, to varying degrees. The Greater Toronto Area, the largest metropolis in the country, has school counselors in 31% of elementary schools, however the remainder of the province averages 6%. Additionally, the elementary schools that have a school counselor are scheduled for an average of 1.5 days per week. These counselors are generally classroom teachers for the remainder of the time. In secondary schools in Ontario, Canada, the average ratio of students to school counselors is 396:1. In 10% of Ontario schools, this average increases to 826:1. There is concern among administration that these staffing levels are not sufficient to meet the needs of students. This has been proven in recent articles appearing in the news featuring student stories of frustration as they prepare for graduation without the support they expected from school counselors. Considering the extensive expectations placed on school counselors, future research needs to address whether or not they can be met within one profession while effectively equipping students with support and information.

School counselors reported in 2004 at a conference in Winnipeg on issues such as budget cuts, lack of clarity about school counselor roles, high student-to-school counselor ratios, especially in elementary schools, and how using a comprehensive school counseling model helped clarify school counselor roles with teachers and administrators and strengthened the profession. More than 15 years later, the profession is continuing to evolve and meet the changing needs of 21st century students in Canada.

China

China has put substantial financial resources into school counseling with strong growth in urban areas but less than 1% of rural students receive it; China does not mandate school counseling.

In China, Thomason & Qiong discussed the main influences on school counseling as Chinese philosophers Confucius and Lao-Tzu, who provided early models of child and adult development who influenced the work of Abraham Maslow and Carl Rogers.

Only 15% of high school students are admitted to college in China, so entrance exams are fiercely competitive. Students entering university graduate at a rate of 99%. Much pressure is put on children and adolescents to study and attend college. This pressure is a central focus of school counseling in China. An additional stressor is that there are not enough places for students to attend college, and over one-third of college graduates cannot find jobs, so career and employment counseling and development are also central in school counseling.

In China, there is a stigma related to social-emotional and mental health issues; therefore, even though most universities and many (urban) primary and secondary schools have school counselors,  many students are reluctant to seek counseling for issues such as anxiety and depression. There is no national system of certifying school counselors. Most are trained in Western-developed cognitive methods including REBT, Rogerian, Family Systems, Behavior Modification, and Object Relations. School counselors also recommend Chinese methods such as qigong (deep breathing) and acupuncture, as well as music therapy. Chinese school counselors work within a traditional Chinese worldview of a community and family-based system that lessens the focus on the individual. In Hong Kong, Hui (2000) discussed work moving toward comprehensive school counseling programs and eliminating the older remediation-style model.

Middle school students are a priority for school counseling services in China.

Costa Rica
Costa Rica mandates school counseling.

Croatia
School counseling is only available in certain schools.

Cyprus
In 1991, Cyprus mandated school counseling with a goal of a 1:60 school counselor-to-student ratio and one full-time school counselor for every high school, but neither of these goals has been accomplished.

Czech Republic
The Czech Republic mandates school counseling.

Denmark
Denmark mandates school counseling.

Egypt
School counseling services are delivered by elementary school psychologists with a ratio of 1 school psychologist to every 3,080 students.

Estonia
School counseling is only available in certain schools.

Finland
In Finland, legislation has been passed for a school counseling system. The Basic Education Act of 1998 stated that every student must receive school counseling services. All Finnish school counselors must have a teaching certificate, a master's degree in a specific academic subject, and a specialized certificate in school counseling. Finland has a school counselor-to-student ratio of 1:245.

France
France mandates school counseling in high schools.

Gambia
Gambia mandates school counseling.

Georgia
The school counselor-to-student ratio in Georgia is 1:615.

Germany
Two German states require school counseling at all education levels; high school counseling is established in all states.

Ghana
Ghana mandates school counseling.

Greece
There are provisions for academic and career counseling in middle and high schools but school counseling is not mandated. Social-emotional and mental-health counseling is done in community agencies. The National Guidance Resources Center in Greece was established by researchers at Athens University of Economics & Business (ASOEE) in 1993 under the leadership of Professor Emmanuel J. Yannakoudakis. The team received funding under the European Union (PETRA II Programme): The establishment of a national occupational guidance resources center in 1993–94. The team organized seminars and lectures to train the first career counselors in Greece in 1993. Further research projects at Athens University of Economics & Business were implemented as part of the European Union (LEONARDO Programme): a) A pilot project on the use of multimedia for career analysis, 1995–1999, b) guidance toward the future, 1995–1999, c) On the move to a guidance system, 1996-2001 and, d) Eurostage for guidance systems, 1996–1999.

Netherlands
School counseling is present in high schools.

Hong Kong
Hong Kong mandates school counseling.

Iceland
Iceland mandates school counseling.

India
In India, counseling is mandated for all schools of all boards

Indonesia
Indonesia mandates school counseling in middle and high school.

Iran
Middle school students are the priority for school counseling in Iran. It is mandated in high schools but there are not enough school counselors particularly in rural areas.

Ireland
In Ireland, school counseling began in County Dublin in the 1960s and went countrywide in the 1970s. However, legislation in the early 1980s severely curtailed the movement due to budget constraints. The main organization for the school counseling profession is the Institute of Guidance Counsellors (IGC), which has a code of ethics.

Israel
In Israel, a 2005 study by Erhard & Harel of 600 elementary, middle, and high school counselors found that a third of school counselors were delivering primarily traditional individual counseling services, about a third were delivering preventive classroom counseling curriculum lessons, and a third were delivering both individual counseling services and school counseling curriculum lessons in a comprehensive developmental school counseling program. School counselor roles varied due to three elements: the school counselor's personal preferences, school level, and the principal's expectations. Erhard & Harel stated that the profession in Israel, like many other countries, is transforming from marginal and ancillary services to a comprehensive school counseling approach integral in the total school's education program. In 2011–12, Israel had a school counselor-to-student ratio of 1:570.

Italy
School counseling is not well developed in Italy.

Japan
In Japan, school counseling is a recent phenomenon with school counselors being introduced in the mid-1990s and often part-time focused on behavioral issues. Middle school students are the priority for school counseling in Japan and it is mandated.

Jordan
Jordan mandates school counseling with 1,950 school counselors working in 2011–12.

Latvia
School counseling was introduced in Latvia in 1929 but disappeared in World War II.

Lebanon
In Lebanon, the government sponsored the first training of school counselors for public elementary and middle schools in 1996. There are now school counselors in one-fifth of the elementary and middle schools in Lebanon but none in high schools. School counselors have been trained in delivering preventive, developmental, and remedial services. Private schools have some school counselors serving all grade levels but the focus is individual counseling and remedial. Challenges include regular violence and wartime strife, not enough resources, and a lack of a professional school counseling organization, assigned school counselors covering two or more schools, and only two school counseling graduate programs in the country. Last, for persons trained in Western models of school counseling, there are dangers of overlooking unique cultural and family aspects of Lebanese society.

Lithuania
School counseling was introduced in 1931 but disappeared during World War II.

Macau
Macau mandates school counseling.

Malaysia
Malaysia mandates school counseling in middle and high school.

Malta
In Malta, school counseling services began in 1968 in the Department of Education based on recommendations from a UNESCO consultant and used these titles: Education Officer, School Counsellor, and Guidance Teacher. Through the 1990s they included school counselor positions in primary and trade schools in addition to secondary schools. Guidance teachers are mandated at a 1:300 teacher to student ratio. Malta mandates school counseling.

Nepal
Nepal mandates school counseling.

New Zealand
New Zealand mandates school counseling but since 1988 when education was decentralized, there has been a decline in the prevalence of school counselors and the quality and service delivery of school counseling.

Nigeria
In Nigeria, school counseling began in 1959 in some high schools. It rarely exists at the elementary level. Where there are federally funded secondary schools, there are some professionally trained school counselors. However, in many cases, teachers function as career educators. School counselors often have teaching and other responsibilities that take time away from their school counseling tasks. The Counseling Association of Nigeria (CASSON) was formed in 1976 to promote the profession, but there is no code of ethics. However, a certification/licensure board has been formed. Aluede, Adomeh, & Afen-Akpaida (2004) discussed the over-reliance on textbooks from the US and the need for school counselors in Nigeria to take a whole-school approach, lessen individual approaches, and honor the traditional African world view valuing the family and community's roles in decision-making as paramount for effective decision-making in schools.

Norway
Norway mandates school counseling.

Oman
There are some school counseling services at the high school level.

Philippines
The Philippines mandates school counseling in middle and high school. The Congress of the Philippines passed the Guidance and Counseling Act of 2004 with a specific focus on Professional Practice, Ethics, National Certification, and the creation of a Regulatory Body, and specialists in school counseling are subject to this law.

Poland
School counseling was introduced in 1918 but disappeared during World War II.

Portugal
Portugal mandates school counseling at the high school level.

Romania
Romania mandates school counseling.

Rwanda
School counseling focuses on trauma-based counseling. It focuses on academic performance, prevention, and intervention with HIV/AIDS, and establishing 
peace-building clubs.

Saudi Arabia
School counseling is developing in Saudi Arabia. In 2010, 90% of high schools had some type of school counseling service.

Serbia
School counseling is available in certain schools.

Singapore
Singapore mandates school counseling.

Slovakia
Slovakia mandates school counseling.

South Korea
In South Korea, school counselors must teach a subject besides counseling, but not all school counselors are appointed to counseling positions, even though Korean law requires school counselors in all middle and high schools.

Spain
Spain provides school counseling at the high school level although it is unclear if mandated. There was around one counselor for every 1,000 primary and secondary (high school) students .

St. Kitts
St. Kitts mandates school counseling.

Sweden
Sweden mandates school counseling. In Sweden, school counselors' work was divided into two work groups in the 1970s. They worked with communication methodology but the 's work is more therapeutic, often psychological and social-emotional issues, and the 's work is future-focused with educational and career development.  work in primary, secondary, adult education, higher education and various training centers and most have a Bachelor of Arts degree in Study and Career Guidance.

Switzerland
School counseling is found at the high school level.

Syria
School counseling has focused on trauma-based counseling of students. Prior to the war it was done in schools but it is now found in either a school club or refugee camp sponsored and staffed by UNICEF.

Taiwan
In Taiwan, school counseling traditionally was done by guidance teachers. Recent advocacy by the Chinese Guidance and Counseling Association pushed for licensure for school counselors in Taiwan's public schools. Prior to this time, the focus had been primarily individual and group counseling, play therapy, career counseling and development, and stress related to national university examinations.

Tanzania
Tanzania mandates school counseling.

Thailand
The Thai government has put substantial funding into school counseling but does not mandate it.

Trinidad and Tobago
Trinidad and Tobago mandate school counseling.

Turkey
Turkey mandates school counseling and it is in all schools.

Uganda
Uganda mandates school counseling.

United Arab Emirates
There is some school counseling at the high-school level in the United Arab Emirates.

United Kingdom
School counseling originated in the UK to support underachieving students and involved specialist training for teachers. Head of Year (e.g., Head of Year 7, Head of Year 8, etc.) are school staff members, usually teachers, who oversee a year group within a secondary school. These Heads of Year ensure students within the year cohort behave properly within the school, but these Heads also support students in their social and emotional well-being and course and career planning options. Wales and Northern Ireland require school counseling.

There has also been a huge leap forward in the United Kingdom within schools, where now professional trained counsellors are being employed to oversee mental health of children. Counsellors do need to be a member of an Accrediting Organisation such as the ISPC to gain the relevant credentials to work in schools.

United States

In the United States, the school counseling profession began with the vocational guidance movement in the early 20th century, now known as career development. Jesse B. Davis was the first to provide a systematic school counseling program focused on career development. In 1907, he became the principal of a high school and encouraged the school English teachers to use compositions and lessons to relate career interests, develop character, and avoid behavioral problems. Many others during this time focused on what is now called career development. For example, in 1908, Frank Parsons, the "father of career counseling", established the Bureau of Vocational Guidance to assist young people transition from school to work.

From the 1920s to the 1930s, school counseling grew because of the rise of progressive education in schools. This movement emphasized personal, social, and moral development. Many schools reacted to this movement as anti-educational, saying that schools should teach only the fundamentals of education. Combined with the economic hardship of the Great Depression, both challenges led to a decline in school counseling. At the same time, the National Association for College Admission Counseling was established as the first professional association focused on counseling and advising high school students into college.  In the early 1940s, the school counseling movement was influenced by the need for counselors to help assess students for wartime needs.  At the same time, researcher Carl Rogers emphasized the power of non-directive helping relationships and counseling for all ages and the profession of counseling was influenced to shift from directive "guidance" to non-directive or person-centered "counseling" as the basis for school counseling.

In the 1950s the government established the Guidance and Personnel Services Section in the Division of State and Local School Systems. In 1957, the Soviet Union launched Sputnik I. Out of concern that the Russians were winning the space race and that there were not enough scientists and mathematicians, the government passed the National Defense Education Act, spurring growth in vocational and career counseling through larger funding. In the 1950s the American School Counselor Association (ASCA) was founded as one of the early divisions of what is now known as the American Counseling Association (ACA).

In the 1960s, new legislation and professional developments refined the school counseling profession (Schmidt, 2003). The 1960s continued large amounts of federal funding for land-grant colleges and universities to establish Counselor Education master's and doctoral programs. School counseling shifted from a primary focus on career development to adding social-emotional issues paralleling the rise of social justice and civil rights movements. In the early 1970s, Dr. Norm Gysbers's research and advocacy helped the profession shift from school counselors as solitary professionals focused on individual academic, career, and social-emotional student issues to a comprehensive developmental school counseling program for all students K-12 that included individual and group counseling for some students and classroom lessons and annual advising/planning and activities for every student. He and his colleagues' research evidenced strong correlations between fully implemented school counseling programs and student academic success; a critical part of the evidence base for the school counseling profession was their work in Missouri. Dr. Chris Sink & associates showed similar evidence-based success for school counseling programs at the elementary and middle school levels in Washington State.

School counseling in the 1980s and early 1990s was not influenced by corporate educational reform efforts. The profession had little evidence of systemic effectiveness for school counselors and only correlational evidence of the effectiveness of school counseling programs. In response, Campbell & Dahir consulted with elementary, middle, and high school counselors and created the American School Counselor Association (ASCA) Student Standards with three core domains (Academic, Career, Personal/Social), nine standards, and specific competencies and indicators for K-12 students. There was no research base, however, for school counseling standards as an effective educational reform strategy. A year later, Whiston & Sexton published the first systemic meta-analysis of school counseling outcome research in academic, career, and personal/social domains and individual counseling, group counseling, classroom lessons, and parent/guardian workshop effectiveness.

In the late 1990s, former mathematics teacher, school counselor, and administrator Pat Martin, was hired by corporate-funded educational reform group, the Education Trust, to focus the school counseling profession on equity issues by helping close achievement and opportunity gaps harming children and adolescents of color, poor and working class children and adolescents, bilingual children and adolescents, and children and adolescents with disabilities. Martin, under considerable heat from Counselor Educators who were not open to her equity-focused message of change, developed focus groups of K-12 students, parents, guardians, teachers, building leaders, and superintendents, and interviewed professors of School Counselor Education. She hired Oregon State University School Counselor Education professor emeritus Dr. Reese House, and after several years of work in the late 1990s they created, in 2003, the National Center for Transforming School Counseling (NCTSC).

The NCTSC focused on changing school counselor education at the graduate level and changing school counselor practice in state and local districts to teach school counselors how to help recognize, prevent, and close achievement and opportunity gaps. In their initial focus groups, they found what Hart & Jacobi had indicated years earlier—too many school counselors were gatekeepers for the status quo instead of advocates for the academic success of every child and adolescent. Too many school counselors used inequitable practices, supported inequitable school policies, and were unwilling to change.

This professional behavior kept many students from non-dominant backgrounds (i.e., students of color, poor and working class students, students with disabilities, and bilingual students) from receiving challenging coursework (AP, IB, and honors classes) and academic, career, and college access/affordability/admission skills needed to successfully graduate from high school and pursue post-secondary options including college. In 1998, the Education Trust received a grant from the DeWitt Wallace/Reader's Digest to fund six $500,000 grants for Counselor Education/School Counseling programs, with a focus on rural and urban settings, to transform School Counselor Education programs to teach advocacy, leadership, teaming and collaboration, equity assessment using data, and culturally competent program counseling and coordination skills in addition to counseling: Indiana State University, the University of Georgia, the University of West Georgia, the University of California-Northridge, the University of North Florida, and, the Ohio State University were the recipients. Over 25 additional Counselor Education/School Counseling programs nationwide became companion institutions in the following decade with average grants of $3000. By 2008, NCTSC consultants had worked in over 100 school districts and major cities and rural areas to transform the work of school counselors nationwide.

In 2002, the American School Counselor Association released Dr. Trish Hatch and Dr. Judy Bowers' work: the ASCA National Model: A framework for school counseling programs comprising key school counseling components: ASCA National Standards, and the skill-based focus for closing achievement and opportunity gaps from the Education Trust's new vision of school counseling into one document. The model drew from major theoreticians in school counseling with four key areas: Foundation (school counseling program mission statements, vision, statements, belief statements, and annual goals); Delivery (direct services including individual and group counseling; classroom counseling lessons; planning and advising for all students); Management (use of action plans and results reports for closing gaps, small group work and classroom lessons; a school counseling program assessment, an administrator-school counselor annual agreement, a time-tracker tool, and a school counseling data tool; and Accountability (school counselor annual evaluation and use of a School Counseling Program Advisory Council to monitor data, outcomes, and effectiveness). In 2003, Dr. Jay Carey and Dr. Carey Dimmitt created the Center for School Counseling Outcome Research and Evaluation (CSCORE) at the University of Massachusetts-Amherst  as a clearinghouse for evidence-based practice with regular research briefs, original research projects, and eventual co-sponsorship of the annual Evidence-Based School Counseling conference in 2013.

In 2004, the ASCA Ethical Standards for School Counselors was revised to focus on issues of equity, closing achievement and opportunity gaps, and ensuring all K-12 students received access to a school counseling program. Also in 2004, an equity-focused entity on school counselors' role in college readiness and admission counseling, the National Office for School Counselor Advocacy (NOSCA) emerged at the College Board led by Pat Martin and Dr. Vivian Lee. NOSCA developed scholarships for research on college counseling by K-12 school counselors taught in School Counselor Education programs.

In 2008, the first NOSCA study was released by Dr. Jay Carey and colleagues focused on innovations in selected College Board "Inspiration Award" schools where school counselors collaborated inside and outside their schools for high college-going rates and strong college-going cultures in schools with large numbers of students of non-dominant backgrounds. In 2008, ASCA released School Counseling Competencies focused on assisting school counseling programs to effectively implement the ASCA National Model.

In 2010, the Center for Excellence in School Counseling and Leadership (CESCAL) at San Diego State University co-sponsored the first of four school counselor and educator conferences devoted to the needs of lesbian, bisexual, gay, and transgender students in San Diego, California. ASCA published a 5th edition of the ASCA Ethical Standards for School Counselors.

In 2011, Counseling at the Crossroads: The perspectives and promise of school counselors in American education, the largest survey of high school and middle school counselors in the United States with over 5,300 interviews, was released by Pat Martin and Dr. Vivian Lee by the National Office for School Counselor Advocacy, the National Association of Secondary School Principals, and the American School Counselor Association. The study shared school counselors' views on educational policies, practices, and reform, and how many of them, especially in urban and rural school settings, were not given the chance to focus on what they were trained to do, especially career and college access and readiness counseling for all students, in part due to high caseloads and inappropriate tasks.

School counselors suggested changes in their role to be accountable for success of all students and how school systems needed to change so school counselors could be key advocates and leaders for every student's success. Implications for public policy and district and school-wide change were addressed. The National Center for Transforming School Counseling released a brief, Poised to Lead: How School Counselors Can Drive Career and College Readiness, challenging all schools to utilize school counselors for equity and access for challenging coursework (AP, IB, honors) for all students and ensuring college and career access skills and competencies as a major focus for school counselors K-12.

In 2012, CSCORE assisted in evaluating and publishing six statewide research studies assessing the effectiveness of school counseling programs based on statewide systemic use of school counseling programs such as the ASCA National Model and published their outcomes in the American School Counselor Association research journal Professional School Counseling. Research indicated strong correlational evidence between fully implemented school counseling programs and low school counselor-to-student ratios provided better student academic success, greater career and college access/readiness/admission, and reduced social-emotional issue concerns included better school safety, reduced disciplinary issues, and better attendance.

Also in 2012, the American School Counselor Association released the third edition of the ASCA National Model.

From 2014–16, the White House, under the Office of the First Lady Michelle Obama, partnered with key school counselor educators and college access professionals nationwide to focus on the roles of school counselors and college access professionals. Their collaboration resulted in a series of national Reach Higher/School Counseling and College Access convenings at Harvard University, San Diego State University, the University of North Florida, and American University. Michelle Obama and her staff also began the Reach Higher and Better Make Room programs to focus on college access for underrepresented students, and she began hosting the American School Counselor Association's School Counselor of the Year awards ceremony at the White House. The initiatives culminated in an unprecedented collaboration among multiple major professional associations focused on school counseling and college access including the American Counseling Association, the American School Counselor Association, the National Association for College Admission Counseling, the College Board, and ACT raising the profile and prominence of the role of school counselors collaborating on college access, affordability, and admission for all students.

In 2015, ASCA replaced the ASCA National Student Standards with the evidence-based ASCA Mindsets & Behaviors for Student Success: K-12 College and Career Readiness Standards for Every Student, created from meta-analyses done by the University of Chicago's Consortium on Educational Reform showing key components of raising student academic success over multiple well-designed research studies. While an improvement over the lack of research in the ASCA student standards that they replaced, school counselors shared feedback that they do not go into enough depth for career, college access/admission/affordability, and social-emotional competencies.

In 2016, ASCA published a newly revised sixth version of the ASCA Ethical Standards for School Counselors using two rounds of feedback from practicing school counselors in all 50 states; it also included, for the first time, a Glossary of ethical terms for heightened clarity.

In 2019, ASCA released the 4th edition of the ASCA National Model, a Framework for School Counseling Programs. Changes included fewer templates and combined templates from the 3rd edition after school counselor feedback that the 3rd edition had become too complex and onerous. The four outside-the-diamond skills from the first three editions: advocacy, leadership, teaming and collaboration, and systemic change were incorporated throughout the model and no longer part of the diamond graphic organizer. The four quadrants of the model were changed to verbs and action-oriented words to better clarify the key components:

1. Define (formerly Foundation)

2. Deliver (formerly Delivery System)

3. Manage (formerly Management System)

4. Assess (formerly Accountability System).

The three types of data collected by school counselors in school counseling programs have shifted in name to:

1. Participation data (formerly process)

2. Mindsets & Behaviors data (formerly perception, i.e., learning)

3. Outcome data (results)

The 4th edition, while easier to read and use than prior editions, did not cover the history of how the model changed over time and neglected any mention of the original authors, Drs. Trish Hatch and Judy Bowers.

Venezuela
School counseling is mandated in Venezuela and it has focused on cultural competency.

Vietnam
School counseling is mandated in Vietnam.

Roles, school counseling programs, ethics, and school counseling professional associations
Professional school counselors ideally implement a school counseling program that promotes and enhances student achievement (Hatch & Bowers, 2003, 2005; ASCA, 2012).
A framework for appropriate and inappropriate school counselor responsibilities and roles is outlined in the ASCA National Model (Hatch & Bowers, 2003, 2005; ASCA, 2012). School counselors, in USA states, have a master's degree in school counseling from a Counselor Education graduate program. China requires at least three years of college experience. In Japan, school counselors were added in the mid-1990s, part-time, primarily focused on behavioral issues. In Taiwan, they are often teachers with recent legislation requiring school counseling licensure focused on individual and group counseling for academic, career, and personal issues. In Korea, school counselors are mandated in middle and high schools.

School counselors are employed in elementary, middle, and high schools, in district supervisory settings, in Counselor Education faculty positions (usually with an earned Ph.D. in Counselor Education in the USA or related graduate doctorates abroad), and post-secondary settings doing academic, career, college access/affordability/admission, and social-emotional counseling, consultation, and program coordination. Their work includes a focus on developmental stages of student growth, including the needs, tasks, and student interests related to those stages (Schmidt, 2003).

Professional school counselors meet the needs of student in three basic domains: academic development, career development and college access/affordability/admission, and social-emotional development (Dahir & Campbell, 1997; Hatch & Bowers, 2003, 2005; ASCA, 2012).  Knowledge, understanding and skill in these domains are developed through classroom instruction, appraisal, consultation, counseling, coordination, and collaboration.  For example, in appraisal, school counselors may use a variety of personality and career assessment methods (such as the Self-Directed Search [SDS] or Career Key [based on the Holland Codes]) to help students explore career and college needs and interests.

Schools play a key role in assessment, access to services, and possible referral to appropriate outside support systems. They provide intervention, prevention, and services to support students' academic, career, and post-secondary education as well as social-emotional growth. The role of school counselors is expansive.  School  counselors address mental health issues, crisis intervention, and advising for course selection. School counselors consult with all stakeholders to support student needs and may also focus on experiential learning, cooperative education, internships, career shadowing, and entrance to specialized high school programs.

School counselor interventions include individual and group counseling for some students.  For example, if a student's behavior is interfering with his or her achievement, the school counselor may observe that student in a class, provide consultation to teachers and other stakeholders to develop (with the student) a plan to address the behavioral , and then collaborate to implement and evaluate the plan. They also provide consultation services to family members such as college access/affordability/admission, career development, parenting skills, study skills, child and adolescent development, mental health issues, and help with school-home transitions.

School counselor interventions for all students include annual academic/career/college access/affordability/admission planning K-12 and leading classroom developmental lessons on academic, career/college, and social-emotional topics.  The topics of mental health, multiculturalism (Portman, 2009), anti-racism, and school safety are important areas of focus for school counselors. Often school counselors will coordinate outside groups to help with student needs such as academics, or coordinate a program that teaches about child abuse or drugs, through on-stage drama (Schmidt, 2003).

School counselors develop, implement, and evaluate school counseling programs that deliver academic, career, college access/affordability/admission, and social-emotional competencies to all students in their schools. For example, the ASCA National Model (Hatch & Bowers, 2003, 2005; ASCA, 2012) includes the following four main areas:

 Foundation (Define as of 2019) - a school counseling program mission statement, a vision statement, a beliefs statement, SMART Goals; ASCA Mindsets & Behaviors & ASCA Code of Ethics;
 Delivery System (Deliver as of 2019) - how school counseling core curriculum lessons, planning for every student, and individual and group counseling are delivered in direct and indirect services to students (80% of school counselor time);
 Management System (Manage as of 2019) - calendars; use of data tool; use of time tool; administrator-school counselor agreement; school counseling program advisory council; small group, school counseling core curriculum, and closing the gap action plans; and
 Accountability System (Assess as of 2019) - school counseling program assessment; small group, school counseling core curriculum, and closing-the-gap results reports; and school counselor performance evaluations based on school counselor competencies.

The school counseling program model (ASCA, 2012, 2019) is implemented using key skills from the National Center for Transforming School Counseling's Transforming School Counseling Initiative:  Advocacy, Leadership, Teaming and Collaboration, and Systemic Change.

Many provinces in Canada offer a career pathway program, which helps to prepare students for the employment market and support a smooth school-to-work transition.

School Counselors are expected to follow a professional code of ethics in many countries. For example, In the US, they are the American School Counselor Association (ASCA) School Counselor Ethical Code, the American Counseling Association (ACA) Code of Ethics, and the National Association for College Admission Counseling (NACAC) Statement of Principles of Good Practice (SPGP).

Some school counselors experience role confusion, given the many tasks they are expected to perform. The demands on the school counselor to be a generalist who performs roles in leadership, advocacy, essential services, and curriculum development can be too much if there is not a clear mission, vision, and comprehensive school counseling program in place. Additionally, some school counselors are stretched too thin to provide mental health support on top of their other duties.

The role of a school counselor is critical and needs to be supported by all stakeholders to ensure equity and access for all students, particularly those with the fewest resources. The roles of school counselors are expanding and changing with time As roles change, school counselors help students prosper in academics, career, post-secondary, and social-emotional domains. School counselors reduce and bridge the inequalities facing students in educational systems.

School counselors around the world are affiliated with various national and regional school counseling associations, and abide by their guidelines. These associations include:

 African Counseling Association (AfCA)
  (AAC-Argentina)
  (APPCPC-Portugal)
 Australian Guidance and Counselling Association (AGCA)
 Hong Kong Association of Guidance Masters and Career Masters (HKAGMCM)
 Cypriot Association of School Guidance Counsellors (OELMEK)
 European Counseling Association (ECA)
 France Ministry of Education
 Hellenic Society of Counselling and Guidance (HESCOG-Greece)
 International Baccalaureate (IB)
 International Society of Psychotherapy and Counselling (ISPC)
 International Vanguard of Counsellors (IVC)
 International Association for Educational and Vocational Guidance (IAEVG)
  (AIOSP)
  (IVSBB)
  (AIOEP)
 Institute of Guidance Counselors (IGC) (Ireland)
 Kenya Association of Professional Counselors (KAPC)
 Department of Education-Malta
 New Zealand Association of Counsellors/ (NZAC)
 Counseling Association of Nigeria (CASSON)
 Philippine Guidance and Counseling Association (PGCA)
 Counseling & Psychotherapy in Scotland (COSCA)
 Singapore Association for Counseling (SAC)
  (FEOP-Spain)
 The Taiwan Guidance and Counseling Association (TGCA)
 Counselling Children and Young People (BACP affiliate, UK)
 British Association for Counselling and Psychotherapy (BACP-UK)
 American Counseling Association (ACA-USA)
 American School Counselor Association (ASCA-USA)
 Center for Excellence in School Counseling and Leadership (CESCaL) (USA)
 Center for School Counseling Outcome Research (CSCOR-USA) Council for the Accreditation of Counseling and Related Educational Programs (CACREP-USA and international)
 National Board for Certified Counselors (NBCC, USA)
 National Office for School Counselor Advocacy (NOSCA) at The College Board (USA)
 National Center for Transforming School Counseling (NCTSC) at The Education Trust (USA)
 Overseas Association of College Admissions Counselors (OACAC an affiliate of National Association of College Admissions Counselors-USA)
Canadian Counselling and Psychotherapy Association - National School Counsellors Chapter (CPPA)
Newfoundland and Labrador Counsellors’ and Psychologists’ Association
PEI Counselling Association
British Columbia School Counsellors
Guidance Council of the Alberta Teachers' Association
Ontario School Counsellors' Association
Nova Scotia School Counsellors Association

Elementary school counseling
Elementary school counselors provide academic, career, college access, and personal and social competencies and planning to all students, and individual and group counseling for some students and their families to meet the developmental needs of young children K-6. Transitions from pre-school to elementary school and from elementary school to middle school are an important focus for elementary school counselors. Increased emphasis is placed on accountability for helping close achievement and opportunity gaps at the elementary level as more school counseling programs move to evidence-based work with data and specific results.

School counseling programs that deliver specific competencies to all students help to close achievement and opportunity gaps. To facilitate individual and group school counseling interventions, school counselors use developmental, cognitive-behavioral, person-centered (Rogerian) listening and influencing skills, systemic, family, multicultural, narrative, and play therapy theories and techniques. Sink & Stroh (2003) released a research study showing the effectiveness of elementary school counseling programs in Washington state.

Middle school counseling
Middle school counselors provide school counseling curriculum lessons on academic, career, college access, and personal and social competencies, advising and academic/career/college access planning to all students and individual and group counseling for some students and their families to meet the needs of older children/early adolescents in grades 7 and 8.

Middle School College Access curricula have been developed to assist students and their families before reaching high school. To facilitate the school counseling process, school counselors use theories and techniques including developmental, cognitive-behavioral, person-centered (Rogerian) listening and influencing skills, systemic, family, multicultural, narrative, and play therapy.  Transitional issues to ensure successful transitions to high school are a key area including career exploration and assessment with seventh and eighth grade students. Sink, Akos, Turnbull, & Mvududu released a study in 2008 confirming the effectiveness of middle school comprehensive school counseling programs in Washington state.

High school counseling
High school counselors provide academic, career, college access, and personal and social competencies with developmental classroom lessons and planning to all students, and individual and group counseling for some students and their families to meet the developmental needs of adolescents (Hatch & Bowers, 2003, 2005, 2012). Emphasis is on college access counseling at the early high school level as more school counseling programs move to evidence-based work with data and specific results that show how school counseling programs help to close achievement, opportunity, and attainment gaps ensuring all students have access to school counseling programs and early college access/affordability/admission activities. The breadth of demands high school counselors face, from educational attainment (high school graduation and some students' preparation for careers and college) to student social and mental health, has led to ambiguous role definition. Summarizing a 2011 national survey of more than 5,330 middle school and high school counselors, researchers argued: "Despite the aspirations of counselors to effectively help students succeed in school and fulfill their dreams, the mission and roles of counselors in the education system must be more clearly defined; schools must create measures of accountability to track their effectiveness; and policymakers and key stakeholders must integrate counselors into reform efforts to maximize their impact in schools across America".

Transitional issues to ensure successful transitions to college, other post-secondary educational options, and careers are a key area. The high school counselor helps students and their families prepare for post-secondary education including college and careers (e.g. college, careers) by engaging students and their families in accessing and evaluating accurate information on what the National Office for School Counselor Advocacy calls the eight essential elements of college and career counseling: (1) College Aspirations, (2) Academic Planning for Career and College Readiness, (3) Enrichment and Extracurricular Engagement, (4) College and Career Exploration and Selection Processes, (5) College and Career Assessments, (6) College Affordability Planning, (7) College and Career Admission Processes, and (8) Transition from High School Graduation to College Enrollment. Some students turn to private college admissions advisors but there is no research evidence that private college admissions advisors have any effectiveness in assisting students attain selective college admissions.

Lapan, Gysbers & Sun showed correlational evidence of the effectiveness of fully implemented school counseling programs on high school students' academic success. Carey et al.'s 2008 study showed specific best practices from high school counselors raising college-going rates within a strong college-going environment in multiple USA-based high schools with large numbers of students of non-dominant cultural identities.

Education credentials, certification, and accreditation
The education of school counselors around the world varies based on the laws and cultures of countries and the historical influences of their educational and credentialing systems and professional identities related to who delivers academic, career, college readiness, and personal/social information, advising, curriculum, and counseling and related services.

Canada 
In Canada, the educational requirements to become a school counselor vary by province. Below is an overview of the general provincial requirements for school counselors:

China 
In China, there is no national certification or licensure system for school counselors.

Korea 
Korea requires school counselors in all middle and high schools.

Philippines 
In the Philippines, school counselors must be licensed with a master's degree in counseling.

Taiwan 
Taiwan instituted school counselor licensure for public schools (2006) through advocacy from the Chinese Guidance and Counseling Association.

United States 
In the US, a school counselor is a certified educator with a master's degree in school counseling (usually from a Counselor Education graduate program) with school counseling graduate training including qualifications and skills to address all students’ academic, career, college access and personal/social needs. Once one has completed a master's degree one can take one of the certification options in order to become fully licensed as a professional school counselor.

Over half of all Counselor Education programs that offer school counseling are accredited by the Council on the Accreditation of Counseling and Related Educational Programs (CACREP) and all in the US with one in Canada. In 2010 one was under review in Mexico. CACREP maintains a current list of accredited programs and programs in the accreditation process on their website. CACREP desires to accredit more international counseling university programs.

According to CACREP, an accredited school counseling program offers coursework in Professional Identity and Ethics, Human Development, Counseling Theories, Group Work, Career Counseling, Multicultural Counseling,  Assessment, Research and Program Evaluation, and Clinical Coursework—a 100-hour practicum and a 600-hour internship under supervision of a school counseling faculty member and a certified school counselor site supervisor (CACREP, 2001).

When CACREP released the 2009 Standards, the accreditation process became performance-based including evidence of school counselor candidate learning outcomes. In addition, CACREP tightened the school counseling standards with specific evidence needed for how school counseling students receive education in foundations; counseling prevention and intervention; diversity and advocacy; assessment; research and evaluation; academic development; collaboration and consultation; and leadership in K-12 school counseling contexts.

Certification practices for school counselors vary internationally. School counselors in the USA may opt for national certification through two different boards. The National Board for Professional Teaching Standards (NBPTS) requires a two-to-three year process of performance based assessment, and demonstrate (in writing) content knowledge in human growth/development, diverse populations, school counseling programs, theories, data, and change and collaboration. In February 2005, 30 states offered financial incentives for this certification.

Also in the US, the National Board for Certified Counselors (NBCC) requires passing the National Certified School Counselor Examination (NCSC), including 40 multiple choice questions and seven simulated cases assessing school counselors' abilities to make critical decisions.  Additionally, a master's degree and three years of supervised experience are required. NBPTS also requires three years of experience, however state certification is required (41 of 50 states require a master's degree). At least four states offer financial incentives for the NCSC certification.

Job growth and earnings

The rate of job growth and earnings for school counselors depends on the country that one is employed in and how the school is funded—public or independent. School counselors working in international schools or "American" schools globally may find similar work environments and expectations to the USA. School counselor pay varies based on school counselor roles, identity, expectations, and legal and certification requirements and expectations of each country. According to the Occupational Outlook Handbook (OOH), the median salary for school counselors in the US in 2010 was (USD) $53,380 or $25.67 hourly. According to an infographic designed by Wake Forest University, the median salary of school counselors in the US was $43,690. The USA has 267,000 employees in titles such as school counselor or related titles in education and advising and college and career counseling. The projected growth for school counselors is 14-19% or faster than average than other occupations in the US with a predicted 94,000 job openings from 2008–2018. In Australia, a survey by the Australian Guidance and Counseling Association found that school counselor salary ranged from (AUD) the high 50,000s to the mid-80,000s.

Among all counseling specialty areas, public elementary, middle and high school counselors are (2009) paid the highest salary on average of all counselors. Budget cuts, however, have affected placement of public school counselors in Canada, Ireland, the United States, and other countries. In the United States, rural areas and urban areas traditionally have been under-served by school counselors in public schools due to both funding shortages and often a lack of best practice models. With the expectation of school counselors to work with data, research, and evidence-based practice, school counselors who show and share results in assisting to close achievement, opportunity, and attainment gaps are in the best position to argue for increased school counseling resources and positions for their programs (Hatch & Bowers, 2003, 2005; ASCA, 2012).

Notable school counselors
 Jamaal Bowman, US politician
 Fernando Cabrera, US politician
 Ern Condon, Canadian politician
 Derrick Dalley, Canadian politician
 Susie Sadlowski Garza, US politician
 François Gendron, Canadian politician
 Steve Lindberg, US politician
 Lillian Ortiz-Self, US politician
 Tony Resch, US lacrosse player
 Tom Tillberry, US politician
 Tom Villa, US politician

See also

 Advocacy
 Career counseling
 Career development
 Character education
 Counseling
 Counselor education
 Education
 Educational equity
 Educational leadership
 Frank Parsons
 List of counseling topics
 Mental health counseling
 Multicultural education
 Play therapy
 School social worker
 School psychology
 Social justice
 Teacher

References

Evidence- and research-based school counseling articles, books, DVDs

Abilities, disabilities, gifts, talents, and special education in school counseling

Chen-Hayes, S. F., Ockerman, M. S., & Mason, E. C. M. (2014). 101 solutions for school counselors and leaders in challenging times. Thousand Oaks, CA: Corwin.

Marshak, L. E., Dandeneau, C. J., Prezant, F. P., & L'Amoreaux, N. A. (2009). The school counselor's guide to helping students with disabilities. San Francisco, CA:  Jossey-Bass.

Trolley, B. C., Haas, H. S., & Patti, D. C. (2009). The school counselor's guide to special education. Thousand Oaks, CA:  Corwin Press.

Academic interventions, closing achievement gaps

Chen-Hayes, S. F., Ockerman, M. S., & Mason, E. C. M. (2014). 101 solutions for school counselors and leaders in challenging times. Thousand Oaks, CA: Corwin.

Hatch, T. (2014). "The use of data in school counseling: Hatching results for students programs, and the profession." Thousand Oaks, CA: Corwin Press.
Holcomb-McCoy, C. (2007). School counseling to close the achievement gap: A social justice framework for success. Thousand Oaks, CA:  Corwin Press.

Johnson, R. S. (2002). Using data to close the achievement gap: How to measure equity in our schools. Thousand Oaks, CA: Corwin.

Schellenberg, R. (2008). The new school counselor: Strategies for universal academic achievement. Lanham, MD: Rowman Littlefield Education.

Squier, K. L., Nailor, P., & Carey, J. C. (2014). Achieving excellence in school counseling through motivation, self-direction, self-knowledge, and relationships. Thousand Oaks, CA: Corwin.

Weinbaum, A. T., Allen, D., Blythe, T., Simon, K., Seidel, S., & Rubin, C. (2004). Teaching as inquiry: Asking hard questions to improve student achievement. New York: Teachers College Press.

Accountability; evidence- and data-based school counseling program curricula, evaluation, and practices

Astramovich, R. L., Hoskins, W. J., & Coker, J. K. (2008). The Accountability Bridge: A model for evaluating school counseling programs. Dubuque, IA: Kendall Hunt.
Brigman, G., Lemberger, M., & Moor, M. (2012).  Striving to evince educational excellence: Measures for Adlerian counselors to demonstrate impact on student achievement and behavior.  Journal of Individual Psychology.
Brigman, G., Villares, E., & Webb, L. (2013). The efficacy of individual psychology approaches for improving student achievement and behavior. Journal of Individual Psychology.

Chen-Hayes, S. F., Ockerman, M. S., & Mason, E. C. M. (2014). 101 solutions for school counselors and leaders in challenging times. Thousand Oaks, CA: Corwin.

Dimmitt, C., Carey, J. C., & Hatch, T. (2007). Evidence-based school counseling: Making a difference with data-driven practices. Thousand Oaks, CA: Corwin Press.

Hatch, T. (2014). "The use of data in school counseling: Hatching results for students programs, and the profession." Thousand Oaks, CA: Corwin Press.

Mariani, M., Webb, L., Villares, E., & Brigman, G. (2012). Effects of participation in student success skills on pro-social and bullying behavior.

Stone, C. B., & Dahir, C. A. (2011). School counselor accountability: A MEASURE of student success (3rd ed.). Boston, MA: Pearson.

Villares, E., Brigman, G., & Maier, A. (2010). Student Success Skills:  Building quality worlds and advocating for school counseling programs. International Journal of Choice Theory and Reality Therapy, 1.

Villares, E., Frain, M., Brigman, G., Webb, L., & Peluso, P. (2012). The impact of Student Success Skills on standardized test scores: A meta-analysis Counseling Outcome Research and Evaluation,doi 2150137811434041

Young, A., & Kaffenberger, C. (2009). Making data work (2nd ed.) Alexandria, VA:  American School Counselor Association.

Advocacy, empowerment, equity, social justice

Bryan, J., Moore-Thomas, C., Day-Vines, N. L., Holcomb-McCoy, C., & Mitchell, N. (2009). Characteristics of students who receive school counseling services: Implications for practice and research. Journal of School Counseling, 7 .
Chen-Hayes, S. F., Ockerman, M. S., & Mason, E. C. M. (2014). 101 solutions for school counselors and leaders in challenging times. Thousand Oaks, CA: Corwin.

Cox, A. A., & Lee, C. C. (2007). Challenging educational inequities: School counselors as agents of social justice. In C. C. Lee, (Ed.)., Counseling for social justice, 2nd ed. (pp. 3–14). Alexandria, VA: American Counseling Association.

Ockerman, M. S., Mason, E. C. M., & Chen-Hayes, S. F. (2013). School counseling supervision in challenging times: The CAFE supervisor model. Journal of Counselor Preparation and Supervision, 5(2), Article 4. DOI:10.7729/51.0024 http://repository.wcsu.edu/jcps/vol5/iss2/4/

Studer, J. R. (2005). The professional school counselor: An advocate for students. Belmont, CA: Wadsworth.

ASCA National Model, school counseling programs, closing gaps

Alberta Education, Special Education Branch (1995). From position to program: Building a comprehensive school guidance and counselling program: Planning and resource guide. Edmonton, Alberta, Canada: Author.
American School Counselor Association/Hatch, T. & Bowers, J. (2012). The ASCA National Model: A framework for school counseling programs, (3rd ed.) Alexandria, VA: Author.

Campbell, C. A., & Dahir, C. A. (1997). Sharing the vision: The national standards for school counseling programs. Alexandria, VA: American School Counselor Association.

Chen-Hayes, S. F., Ockerman, M. S., & Mason, E. C. M. (2014). 101 solutions for school counselors and leaders in challenging times. Thousand Oaks, CA: Corwin.

De Leon, Angela P., 2011. "A Model Prekindergarten through 4th Year of College (P-16) Individual Graduation Plan Proposal." Applied Research Projects, Texas State University-San Marcos. http://ecommons.txstate.edu/arp/364

Fezler, B., & Brown, C. (2011). The international model for school counseling programs. Pembroke Pines, FL: Association of American Schools in South America (AASSA).  https://www.aassa.com/uploaded/Educational_Research/US_Department_of_State/Counseling_Standards/International_Counseling_Model_Handbook.pdf

 Hatch, T. (2008). Professional challenges in school counseling: Organizational, institutional and political. Journal of School Counseling, 6(22).
Hatch, T. (2014). The use of data in school counseling: Hatching results for students, programs and the professions. Thousand Oaks, CA: Corwin Press.
Hatch, T., & Bowers, J. (2003, 2005, 2012). The ASCA National Model: A framework for school counseling programs. Alexandria, VA: American School Counselor Association.

Lapan, R. T. (2001). Results-based comprehensive guidance and counseling programs: A framework for planning and evaluation. Professional School Counseling, 4 .

Lee, V. V., & Goodnough, G. E. (2011). Systemic, data-driven school counseling practice and programming for equity. In B. T. Erford, (Ed.)., "Transforming the school counseling profession." (pp. 129–153). Boston: Pearson.

Nova Scotia Department of Education. (2002). Comprehensive guidance and counselling program. Halifax, Nova Scotia, Canada: Author.

Schwallie-Giddis, P., ter Maat, M., & Pak, M. (2003). Initiating leadership by introducing and implementing the ASCA National Model. Professional School Counseling, 6  170-17 .

Bilingual school counseling

Bruhn, R. A., Irby, B. J., Lou, M., Thweatt, W. T. III, & Lara-Alecio, R. (2005). A model for training bilingual school counselors. In J. Tinajero and V. Gonzales (Eds.), Review of research and practice, (pp. 145–161). Mahwah, NJ: Erlbaum.
Chen-Hayes, S. F., Ockerman, M. S., & Mason, E. C. M. (2014). 101 solutions for school counselors and leaders in challenging times. Thousand Oaks, CA: Corwin.

Career and college access/admission/readiness; closing opportunity/attainment gaps

Chen-Hayes, S. F., Ockerman, M. S., & Mason, E. C. M. (2014). 101 solutions for school counselors and leaders in challenging times. Thousand Oaks, CA: Corwin.
Chen-Hayes, S. F., Saud Maxwell, K., & Bailey, D. F. (2009). Equity-based school counseling: Ensuring career and college readiness for every student.  DVD. Hanover, MA:  Microtraining Associates.
The College Board. (2008). Inspiration & innovation: Ten effective counseling practices from the College Board's Inspiration Award schools. Washington, D.C.: Author.
The College Board. (2010). The college counseling sourcebook: Advice and strategies from experienced school counselors. (7th ed.). Washington, DC: Author.

De Leon, Angela P., 2011. A Model Prekindergarten Through 4th Year of College (P-16) Individual Graduation Plan Proposal. Applied Research Projects, Texas State University-San Marcos. http://ecommons.txstate.edu/arp/364
Fallon, M. A. C. (2011). Enrollment management's sleeping giant: The net price calculator mandate. Journal of College Admissions, Spring, 6-13.
Fitzpatrick, C., & Costantini, K. (2011). Counseling 21st Century students for optimal college and career readiness: A 9th-12th grade curriculum. New York, NY: Routledge.

 Hatch, T., & Bardwell, R. (2012). School counselors using data. In National Association for College Admission Counseling (Ed.), NACAC's Fundamentals of College Admission Counseling (3rd ed.). Arlington, VA: Counseling.
Hatch, T. (2012). School counselors: Creating a college-going culture in K-12 schools. In National Association for College Admission Counseling (Ed.), NACAC's Fundamentals of College Admission Counseling (3rd ed.). Arlington, VA: National Association for College Admission Counseling.
Horn, L., & Berktold, J. (1999). Students with disabilities in postsecondary education: A profile of preparation, participation, and outcomes. (National Center for Education Statistics No. 187). Washington, D. C.: United States Department of Education.
Hossler, D., Schmidt, J., & Vesper, N. (1998). Going to college: How social, economic, and educational factors influence the decisions students make. Baltimore: Johns Hopkins University Press.

National Association of College Admission Counseling. (2008). Fundamentals of college admission counseling (2d ed.). Dubuque, IA: Kendall-Hunt.

Caseloads, collaboration, resources, schedule changes, school counselor/student ratios

Chen-Hayes, S. F., Ockerman, M. S., & Mason, E. C. M. (2014). 101 solutions for school counselors and leaders in challenging times. Thousand Oaks, CA: Corwin.

Counseling theories in schools

Henderson, D. A. & Thompson, C. L. (2010). Counseling children. New York: Brooks/Cole/Cengage.

Perusse, R., and Goodnough, G. E., (Eds.). (2004). Leadership, advocacy, and direct service strategies for professional school counselors. Belmont, CA: Brooks/Cole/Cengage.

Sklare, G. B. (2014). Brief counseling that works: A solution-focused therapy approach for school counselors and other mental health professionals (3rd ed). Thousand Oaks, CA: Corwin Press.
Winslade, J. M., & Monk G. D. (2007). Narrative counseling in schools: Powerful and brief (2nd ed.). Thousand Oaks, CA: Corwin Press.

Credentialing exams for school counselors

Schellenberg, R. (2012). The school counselor’s study guide for credentialing exams. New York: Routledge.

Cultural competence, ethnic/racial identity development in schools

Chen-Hayes, S. F., Ockerman, M. S., & Mason, E. C. M. (2014). 101 solutions for school counselors and leaders in challenging times. Thousand Oaks, CA: Corwin.

Holcomb-McCoy, C. & Chen-Hayes, S. F. (2011). Culturally competent school counselors: Affirming diversity by challenging oppression. In B. T. Erford, (Ed). Transforming the school counseling profession. (3rd ed). (pp. 90–109). Boston: Pearson.

Counseling core curriculum, lesson plans, classroom management

Fitzpatrick, C., & Costantini, K. (2011). Counseling 21st Century students for optimal college and career readiness: A 9th-12th grade curriculum. New York, NY: Routledge.

Goodnough, G. E., Perusse, R., & Erford, B. T. (2011). Developmental classroom guidance. In B. T. Erford, (Ed.)., Transforming the school counseling profession (3rd ed.). (pp. 154–177). Boston: Pearson.
Perusse, R., & Goodnough, G. E., (Eds.). (2004). Leadership, advocacy, and direct service strategies for professional school counselors. Belmont, CA: Brooks/Cole.
Villares, E., Brigman, G., & Maier, A. (2010). Student Success Skills:  Building quality worlds and advocating for school counseling programs. International Journal of Choice Theory and Reality Therapy, 1.

Villares, E., Frain, M., Brigman, G., Webb, L., & Peluso, P. (2012). The impact of Student Success Skills on standardized test scores: A meta-analysis Counseling Outcome Research and Evaluation,doi 2150137811434041

Ethics and law in school counseling

Stone, C. B. (2005). School counseling principles: Ethics and law. Alexandria, VA:  American School Counselor Association.

Gay, lesbian, bisexual, transgender school counseling

Chen-Hayes, S. F. (2012). Counseling and advocacy with a gay father, a straight mom, and a transgender adolescent. In S. H. Dworkin & M. Pope, (Eds.)., Casebook for counseling lesbian, gay, bisexual, and transgender persons and their families (pp. 45–52). Alexandria, VA:  American Counseling Association.

Chen-Hayes, S. F., & Haley-Banez, L. (2000). Lesbian, bisexual, gay, and transgendered counseling in schools and families (1, 2). DVDs. Hanover, MA: Microtraining Associates.
Chen-Hayes, S. F., Ockerman, M. S., & Mason, E. C. M. (2014). 101 solutions for school counselors and leaders in challenging times. Thousand Oaks, CA: Corwin.

Fisher, E. S., & Komosa-Hawkins, K., (Eds.). (2013). Creating safe and supportive learning environments: A guide for working with lesbian, gay, bisexual, transgender, and questioning youth and families. New York: Routledge.

Ryan, C., & Chen-Hayes, S. F. (2013). Educating and empowering families of lesbian, gay, bisexual, transgender, and questioning students. In E. S. Fisher & K. Komosa-Hawkins, (Eds.)., Creating safe and supportive learning environments: A guide for working with lesbian, gay, bisexual, transgender, and questioning youth and families (pp. 209–229). New York: Routledge.

Smith, S. D., & Chen-Hayes, S. F. (2004). Leadership and advocacy strategies for lesbian, bisexual, gay, transgendered, and questioning (LBGTQ) students: Academic, career, and interpersonal success. In R. Perusse and G. E. Goodnough (Eds.), Leadership, advocacy, and direct service strategies for professional school counselors (pp. 187–221). Belmont, CA: Brooks/Cole/Cengage.

Group counseling in schools

Brigman, G., & Early, B. (2001). Group counseling for school counselors: A practical guide. Portland, ME: Walch.

International school counseling

Aluede, O. O., Adomeh, I. O. C., & Afen-Akpaida, J. E. (2004). Some thoughts about the future of guidance and counseling in Nigeria. Education Winter, 2004.

Erhard, R., & Harel, Y. (2005). International Journal for the Advancement of Counseling, 27  87–98.
Harris, B. (2013). International school-based counselling scoping report. https://www.bacp.co.uk/media/2050/counselling-minded-international-school-based-counselling-harris.pdf
Hosenshil, T. H., Amundson, N. E., & Niles, S. G. (2013). Counseling around the world: An international handbook. Alexandria, VA: American Counseling Association.

Fezler, B., & Brown, C. (2011). The international model for school counseling programs. Pembroke Pines, FL: Association of American Schools in South America (AASSA).  https://www.aassa.com/uploaded/Educational_Research/US_Department_of_State/Counseling_Standards/International_Counseling_Model_Handbook.pdf

Jiang, G. R. (2007). The development of school counseling in the Chinese mainland. Journal of Basic Education, 14" 65-82.
Lee, S. M., Oh, I., & Suh, S. (2007). Comparison study of Korean and
American school counseling for developing a Korean school counseling model. Korean Journal of Counseling Psychology, 19, 539-567.

Thomason, T. C., & Qiong, X. (2007). School counseling in China Today. Journal of School Counseling, Downloaded from   June 19, 2009.

Leadership, systemic change, principal perceptions of school counseling

Chen-Hayes, S. F., Miller, E. M., Bailey, D. F., Getch, Y. Q., & Erford, B. T. (2011). Leadership and achievement advocacy for every student. In B. T. Erford, (Ed)., Transforming the school counseling profession (3rd ed.) (pp. 110–128). Boston, MA: Pearson.
Chen-Hayes, S. F., Ockerman, M. S., & Mason, E. C. M. (2014). 101 solutions for school counselors and leaders in challenging times. Thousand Oaks, CA: Corwin.

Devoss, J. A., & Andrews, M. F. (2006). School counselors as educational leaders. Boston, MA: Houghton-Mifflin.

Johnson, J., Rochkind, J., Ott, A., & DuPont, S. (2010). Can I get a little advice here? How an overstretched high school guidance system is undermining students' college aspirations. San Francisco: Public Agenda.

Reynolds, S. E., & Hines, P. L. (2001). Guiding all kids: Systemic guidance for achievement in schools. (2nd ed.). Bloomington, IN: American Student Achievement Institute.
Reynolds, S. E., & Hines, P. L. (2001). Vision-to-action: A step-by-step activity guide for systemic educational reform. (6th ed.). Bloomington, IN: American Student Achievement Institute.

Outcome research in school counseling

Brooks-McNamara, V., & Torres, D. (2008). The reflective school counselor's guide to practitioner research: Skills and strategies for successful inquiry. Thousand Oaks, CA: Corwin Press.

Lapan, R. T., Whitcomb, S. A., & Aleman, N. M. (2012). Connecticut professional school counselors: College and career counseling services and smaller ratios benefit students. " Professional School Counseling 16," 117-124.

Personal/social interventions: abuse, addictions, anxiety, bullying, conflict, obesity, peer mediation, self-mutilation, violence)

Carney, J. V. (2008). Perceptions of bullying and associate trauma during adolescence. Professional School Counseling, 11, 179–188.
Chen-Hayes, S. F., Ockerman, M. S., & Mason, E. C. M. (2014). 101 solutions for school counselors and leaders in challenging times. Thousand Oaks, CA: Corwin.

Curtis, R., Van Horne, J. W., Robertson, P., & Karvonen, M. (2010). Outcomes of a school-wide positive behavioral support program. Professional School Counseling, 13  159-164.

 Walley, C. T., & Grothaus, T. (2013). A qualitative examination of school counselors’ training to recognize and respond to adolescent mental health issues Journal of School Counseling 11(11). Retrieved from

Poverty, homelessness, classism

Rural school counseling

School-family-community partnerships; parenting interventions for academic success

Bryan, J., & Holcomb-McCoy, C. (2010). Collaboration and partnerships with families and communities. Professional School Counseling, 14  ii-v.

Chen-Hayes, S. F., Ockerman, M. S., & Mason, E. C. M. (2014). 101 solutions for school counselors and leaders in challenging times. Thousand Oaks, CA: Corwin.

Griffen, D., & Farris, A. (2010). School counselors and school-family-community collaboration: Finding resources through community asset mapping, 13  248–256.

Suarez-Orozco, C., Onaga, M., & de Lardemelle, C. (2010). Promoting academic engagement among immigrant adolescents through school-family-community collaboration. Professional School Counseling, 14  15-26.

Supervision, site supervisors, and school counselor education

Chen-Hayes, S. F., Ockerman, M. S., & Mason, E. C. M. (2014). 101 solutions for school counselors and leaders in challenging times. Thousand Oaks, CA: Corwin.

Ockerman, M. S., Mason, E. C. M., & Chen-Hayes, S. F. (2013). School counseling supervision in challenging times: The CAFE supervisor model. Journal of Counselor Preparation and Supervision, 5(2), Article 4. DOI:10.7729/51.0024 http://repository.wcsu.edu/jcps/vol5/iss2/4/

Schellenberg, R. (2012). The school counselor's guide to credentialing exams. New York: Routledge.
Stoltenberg, C. D., & McNeil, B. W. (2009). IDM supervision: An integrated developmental model for supervising counselors and therapists (3rd ed.). New York: Routledge.
Studer, J. R. (2006). Supervising the school counselor trainee: Guidelines for practice. Alexandria, VA:  American Counseling Association.

Studer, J. R., & Diambra, J. F. (2010). A guide to practicum and internship for school counselor trainees. New York: Routledge.

Technology and school counseling

Chen-Hayes, S. F., Ockerman, M. S., & Mason, E. C. M. (2014). 101 solutions for school counselors and leaders in challenging times. Thousand Oaks, CA: Corwin.

Sabella, R. (2008). GuardingKids.com: A practical guide to keeping kids out of high-tech trouble. Minneapolis, MN: Educational Media.
Sabella, R. (2004). Counseling in the 21st Century: Using technology to improve practice. Alexandria, VA: American Counseling Association.
Sabella, R. (2003). SchoolCounselor.com: A friendly and practical guide to the World Wide Web (2nd ed.). Minneapolis, MN: Educational Media.
Schellenberg, R. C. (2008). The new school counselor: Strategies for universal academic achievement. Rowman Littlefield Education.

Transforming school counseling roles and professional identity

Chen-Hayes, S. F., Ockerman, M. S., & Mason, E. C. M. (2014). 101 solutions for school counselors and leaders in challenging times. Thousand Oaks, CA: Corwin.

Hart, P. J., & Jacobi, M. (1992). From gatekeeper to advocate: Transforming the role of the school counselor. New York: College Entrance Examination Board.

Kurosawa, S. (2000). Sukuru kaunseringu katsudo no gohonbasira/Five important roles in school counselling. In M. Murayama (Ed.), Rinsyoshinrisi niyoru sukuru kaunsera: Jissai to tenbo (pp. 89–99). Tokyo, Shibundo.

Martin, P. J., Robinson, S. G., & Erford, B. T. (2011). Transforming the school counseling profession. In B. T. Erford, Ed., Transforming the school counseling profession (3rd ed). (pp. 1–18). Boston: Pearson.

Murayama, S. (2002). Rinsyoshinrisi niyoru sukuru maunsera no tenkai/The development of school counsellors by clinical psychologists. In M. Murayama (Ed.), Rinsyoshinrisi niyoru sukuru kaunsera: Jissai to tenbo (pp. 9–22). Tokyo: Shibundo.
Ockerman, M. S., Mason, E. C. M., & Chen-Hayes, S. F. (2013). School counseling supervision in challenging times: The CAFE supervisor model. Journal of Counselor Preparation and Supervision, 5(2), Article 4. DOI:10.7729/51.0024 http://repository.wcsu.edu/jcps/vol5/iss2/4/
Okamoto, J. (2002). Sukuru kaunsera tono renkei/Collaboration with school counsellors. In T. Matsuhara (Ed.), Sukuru kausera to renkei shita shido (pp. 4–13). Tokyo: Kyoikukaihatsukenkyusyo.

Schellenberg, R. (2012). The school counselor's study guide for credentialing exams. New York: Routledge.
Schellenberg, R. (2008). The new school counselor: Strategies for universal academic achievement. Rowman Littlefield.
Sink, C. (2011). School-wide responsive services and the value of collaboration. Professional School Counseling, 14  ii-iv.

Stone, C. B., & Dahir, C. A. (2006). The transformed school counselor. Boston, MA: Lahaska Press/Houghton Mifflin.

External links

American School Counselor Association
Counselling Tutor
Center for Excellence in School Counseling and Leadership
Center for School Counseling Outcome Research and Evaluation
Evidence Based School Counseling Conference
School and Career Counselors
National Association for College Admission Counseling
National Career Development Association

Education and training occupations

People who work with children

ja:スクールカウンセラー